Mariusz Staszewski (born 25 January 1975 in Poland) is a former motorcycle speedway rider from Poland, who was second in the 2001 Individual Speedway European Championship.

Career
He gained his speedway licence in 1991.

Honours 
 Individual European Championship:
 2001 – silver medal (13 points)
 2007 – 10th place (6 points)

See also 
 Poland national speedway team

References 

Polish speedway riders
1975 births
Living people
Polonia Bydgoszcz riders